Robert De Veen (25 March 1886 – 8 December 1939) was a Belgian football player and manager. He was born in Bruges.

He played for Club Brugge and Belgium, scoring 26 goals for 23 caps, including 13 goals against France.

He coached Racing de Tournai, RC Lens, Olympique Lillois, Club Brugge.

International career

References

External links
Biography at Club Brugge

1886 births
1939 deaths
Belgian footballers
Belgium international footballers
Club Brugge KV players
Belgian Pro League players
Belgian football managers
Belgian expatriate football managers
RC Lens managers
Olympique Lillois managers
Club Brugge KV head coaches
Expatriate football managers in France
Belgian expatriate sportspeople in France
Footballers from Bruges
Association football forwards